International Christian School of Budapest (ICSB) is a private, Christian, co-educational international school in Diósd, Pest, Hungary. It was established in 1994 and is the only ACT test center in Hungary. It is known to be a popular choice among Chinese parents.

History 
International Christian School of Budapest was established in 1994 and was first accredited by the Middle States Association Commissions on Elementary and Secondary Schools (MSA-CESS) in 1999. In 2016, it was one of 23 international schools to earn "reaccreditation, the gold standard for measuring and advancing school improvement", the top recognition from MSA-CESS.

The East-West Church and Ministry Report wrote in 1999 that multiple Christian missions have relocated to Budapest because of its strategic location halfway between the Baltic and Adriatic Seas, but added, "One of the major factors for missions relocating regional offices to Budapest has been the development of the International Christian School of Budapest, an accredited program (grades 1-12) with 150 students."

Curriculum 
The school's curriculum is primarily US based. In 2019–20, the school offered eight Advanced Placement courses (Biology, Calculus AB, English Literature and Composition, Human Geography, Macroeconomics and Microeconomics, Physics 1, and Statistics). In recent years, it has also offered Studio Art: 2-D (now known as 2-D Art and Design) and European History.

, it is the only ACT test center in Hungary.

References

External links 
 

Private schools in Hungary
International schools in Hungary
Educational institutions established in 1994
1994 establishments in Hungary